Martin Johansson (born October 24, 1987) is a Swedish professional ice hockey player. He is currently a forward for HC TPS in the Finnish Liiga. He represented Sweden in the World Junior Championship in 2007, leading the fourth place Swedish team with three goals.

Martin is the older brother of Marcus Johansson.

References

External links

1987 births
Living people
Bofors IK players
Brynäs IF players
Färjestad BK players
People from Landskrona Municipality
Malmö Redhawks players
Mora IK players
Örebro HK players
Swedish ice hockey left wingers
Sportspeople from Skåne County
HC TPS players